Showbiz Konek na Konek (English: Showbiz Connect to Connect) is a Philippine entertainment news and talk show that is airing on TV5 since April 6, 2015, Weekdays at 11am. The show exempiflied unbiased showbiz reportage on artists from three big networks and giving exclusive interviews on the newsmakers in the showbiz industry.

Hosts 
 IC Mendoza
 MJ Marfori-Oida
 Bianca King
 Nicole Estrada (Kanto Girl)

See also 
 List of programs broadcast by TV5

References

External links 
 
 

TV5 (Philippine TV network) original programming
Entertainment news shows in the Philippines
Philippine television talk shows
2015 Philippine television series debuts
2015 Philippine television series endings
Filipino-language television shows